Songs for Little Pickers is a live album by American folk music artist Doc Watson, released in 1990. It contains songs Watson learned as a child.

Track listing
All songs Traditional unless otherwise noted.
 "Talkin' Guitar" – 2:31
 "Mole in the Ground" – 2:39
 "Mama Blues" – 1:38
 "Froggie Went A-Courtin'" – 4:04
 "Shady Grove" – 2:48
 "Riddle Song" – 2:41
 "Sing Song Kitty	" – 2:20
 "John Henry" – 4:23
 "Sally Goodin' " – 0:55
 "Crawdad Song" – 2:31
 "And the Green Grass Grew All Around" – 2:50
 "Liza Jane" – 1:58
 "Tennessee Stud" (Jimmie Driftwood) – 4:38

Personnel
Doc Watson – guitar, banjo, harmonica, vocals
Jack Lawrence – guitar
Production notes
Produced by Mitch Greenhill
Engineered and mixed by Chuck Eller

References

External links
 Doc Watson discography

1990 live albums
Doc Watson live albums
Sugar Hill Records live albums